Petersham Parish is one of the 57 parishes of Cumberland County, New South Wales, a cadastral unit for use on land titles. It is located to the south of Iron Cove, Rozelle Bay and the Parramatta River, and to the north of Cooks River. It includes the suburbs of Balmain, Leichhardt, Petersham, Newtown, Marrickville, Tempe, Glebe and St Peters. It roughly corresponds to the eastern half of the Inner West region, with the neighbouring Parish of Concord making up the western half.

References

Parishes of Cumberland County
Geography of New South Wales
Populated places in New South Wales